Ciceri e tria  is a pasta dish in Italian cuisine that originated in Apulia. It is a part of the cuisine in the Salento region of Italy. It is prepared with pasta and chickpeas as primary ingredients, and includes fried pasta. The dish may be served as a primi piatti dish, a first course that consists of a pasta dish. It has been described as a "classic and emblematic dish of Salentine cuisine" and as a specialty dish of Apulia.

Origin
Ciceri e tria has been stated to have originated in the Salento region of Italy (which is within the region of Apulia), where it is a common dish.

Etymology
Ciceri means "chickpeas" in Latin. Tria, meaning "pasta" or "noodle," derives from an Arabic word for pasta,   (from the root طرو ṭ-r-w or طري ṭ-r-y 'to be fresh, moist, tender'). It means "pasta" in the Genoese dialect. "Tria" can also refer to tagliatelle, a traditional pasta, the term being from the dialect of Apulia. Tria can also refer to a type of pasta in Sicily. Tria is an old word that is still used in many areas of Southern Italy, particularly in Sicily.

Ingredients and preparation
Pasta and chickpeas are the primary ingredients in Ciceri e tria. Some versions of the dish may have a significant amount of broth, which may be eaten using a spoon. Some of the pasta (from one-third to one-half) is fried in oil as part of its preparation, while the rest of it is boiled. The use of fried pasta was originally performed to create a quality or mouthfeel of meatiness in the dish during times of meat scarcity. The fried pasta may also add crunchiness to the dish. Apulian versions may involve the chickpeas being simmered over a low heat while fresh pasta is being prepared. Dried/uncooked chickpeas may be soaked one day prior to preparation of the dish. Additional ingredients may include onion, carrot, celery and garlic. It may be seasoned with black pepper. It has been described as having a bacon-like flavor. It may be served as a side dish with bread or rice.

Service
In Apulia, the dish is a common primi piatti dish, which is a first course of pasta. In the Italian formal meal structure, a first course is referred to as primo, and typically consists of hot food.

See also

 Pasta e ceci
 List of Italian dishes
 List of legume dishes
 List of pasta dishes

References

Sources

Further reading

 

Pasta dishes
Chickpea dishes
Cuisine of Apulia